Steel Town or variant may refer to:

Steel Town
 Steel Town (Karachi), a residential area for employees of Pakistan Steel Mills, Karachi
 Steel Town (1950 film), a Czech drama film directed by Martin Frič
 Steel Town (1952 film), a 1952 film directed by George Sherman

Steeltown
 Steeltown (1984 album), album by Big Country
 Steeltown, nickname for the city of Hamilton, Ontario, in Canada

See also
 Steel (disambiguation)
 Steel City
 Steelville
 Steelton
 Steele (disambiguation)
 Steele City
 Steeleville
 Fort Steele